The 2012 ATP Roller Open was a professional tennis tournament played on hard courts. It was the first edition of the tournament which was part of the 2012 ATP Challenger Tour. It took place in Pétange, Luxembourg between 10 and 16 September 2012.

Singles main-draw entrants

Seeds

 1 Rankings are as of August 27, 2012.

Other entrants
The following players received wildcards into the singles main draw:
  Tobias Kamke
  Paul-Henri Mathieu
  Maciej Najfeld
  Ugo Nastasi

The following players received entry from the qualifying draw:
  Gilles Kremer
  Jules Marie
  Elie Rousset
  Gauthier Stauffer

Champions

Singles

 Tobias Kamke def.  Paul-Henri Mathieu, 7–6(9–7), 6–4

Doubles

 Christopher Kas /  Dick Norman def.  Jamie Murray /  André Sá, 2–6, 6–2, [10–8]

External links
Official Website

ATP Roller Open
ATP Roller Open
2012 in Luxembourgian tennis